Carlos de Borja y Centellas (1663–1733) was a Spanish cardinal. He served as Patriarch of the West Indies and as the first Vicariate-General of the Spanish armies. He was elevated to the cardinalate in 1720, after receiving the recommendation of King Philip V. He was installed as cardinal-priest of Santa Pudenziana in 1721. He had a brother, Francisco, who was also a cardinal.

References

External links
Biographical Dictionary - Consistory of September 30, 1720
Cardinal Borja by Andrea Procaccini

1663 births
1733 deaths
Carlos
18th-century Spanish cardinals